The 2019 Big West Conference women's soccer tournament was the postseason women's soccer tournament for the Big West Conference held on November 7 and 10, 2019. The three-match tournament took place at Titan Stadium in Fullerton, California. The four-team single-elimination tournament consisted of two rounds based on seeding from regular season conference play. The defending champions were the Long Beach State 49ers, but they failed to qualify for the 2019 tournament. The Cal State Fullerton Titans won the title by beating the Cal State Northridge Matadors 2–0 in the final.  This was the eighth Big West tournament title for the Cal State Fullerton program and the sixth for head coach Demian Brown.

Bracket

Schedule

Semifinals

Final

Statistics

Goalscorers 
2 Goals
 Maddie Bennett (Cal State Fullerton)

1 Goal
 Haley Brown (Cal State Fullerton)
 Megan Day (Cal State Fullerton)
 Kaya Hawkinson (Cal State Fullerton)
 Atlanta Priums (Cal State Fullerton)
 Savannah Sloniger (Cal State Fullerton)
 Alexis White (Cal State Northridge)

See also 
 Big West Conference
 2019 NCAA Division I women's soccer season
 2019 NCAA Division I Women's Soccer Tournament

References 

Big West Conference Women's Soccer Tournament
2019 Big West Conference women's soccer season